Telomere resolvase, also known as protelomerase, is an enzyme found in bacteria which contain linear plasmids.

Function
In order to prevent exonuclease degradation of their chromosomes, bacterial linear plasmids contain hairpin turns at the ends. During DNA replication, a replication bubble forms in the linear plasmid and expands until a circular plasmid-like structure is formed. Telomere resolvase then cuts the structure and reforms the hairpin turns, forming two new, identical linear plasmids.

References 
resolvase